The Proceedings of the Institution of Mechanical Engineers, Part M: Journal of Engineering for the Maritime Environment is a quarterly peer-reviewed scientific journal covering research on the design, production, and operation of engineering artefacts for the maritime environment. The journal covers subjects including naval architecture, marine engineering, offshore/ocean engineering, coastal engineering and port engineering. It was established in 2002 and is published by SAGE Publications on behalf of the Institution of Mechanical Engineers.

Abstracting and indexing 
The journal is abstracted and indexed in Scopus and the Science Citation Index Expanded. According to the Journal Citation Reports, the journal has a 2013 impact factor of 0.458.

References

External links 
 

Engineering journals
English-language journals
Institution of Mechanical Engineers academic journals
Publications established in 2002
Quarterly journals
SAGE Publishing academic journals